I Blame the World is the second studio album by American singer and songwriter Sasha Alex Sloan. It was released on May 13, 2022, by RCA Records.

In promotion of the album, Sloan performed "I Blame the World" on Jimmy Kimmel Live! on April 26, 2022. In May 2022, Sloan is expected to support American band LANY on their Australia and New Zealand tour. Sloan is also scheduled to embark on a solo US tour, beginning on July 21, 2022 at First Avenue in Minneapolis, and concluding on September 10, 2022 in Nashville, Tennessee.

Track listing
All songs are written by Sasha Alex Sloan (Alexandra Yatchenko) and King Henry, unless stated otherwise.

References

2022 albums
Albums produced by King Henry (producer)
Albums produced by Mike Elizondo
Albums produced by Stuart Price
RCA Records albums
Sasha Alex Sloan albums